George Brown (November 29, 1818 – May 9, 1880) was a British-Canadian journalist, politician and one of the Fathers of Confederation; attended the Charlottetown (September 1864) and Quebec (October 1864) conferences. A noted Reform politician, he is best known as the founder and editor of the Toronto Globe, Canada's most influential newspaper at the time, and his leadership in the founding of the Liberal Party in 1867. He was an articulate champion of the grievances and anger of Upper Canada (Ontario). He played a major role in securing national unity.  His career in active politics faltered after 1865, but he remained a powerful spokesman for the Liberal Party. He promoted westward expansion and opposed the policies of Conservative Prime Minister John A. Macdonald.

Early life

Scotland
George Brown was born in Alloa, Clackmannanshire, Scotland, United Kingdom, on November 29, 1818. His father, Peter Brown, ran a wholesale business in Edinburgh and managed a glassworks in Alloa. His mother was Marianne ( Mackenzie).  George was their eldest son; he had two older sisters, two younger sisters and four younger brothers, although three of the brothers died in infancy. He was baptised in St. Cuthbert's Chapel of Ease. He lived in Alloa until he moved to Edinburgh before he turned eight. He attended Royal High School, then transferred to the Southern Academy of Edinburgh.

Upon graduation his father wanted George to attend university but George convinced his father to let him work in the family's business. He briefly lived in London to be taught by agents of the business before returning to Edinburgh. He joined the Philo-Lectic Society of Edinburgh, where young men would meet and discuss topics in a parliamentary debate. Brown's father also worked as a collector of assessments. Some of the funds he collected for the municipality were mixed with his business bank accounts, and in 1836 some of the funds in these accounts were lost in business speculations. Peter was not accused of corruption, but he sought to repair his reputation and recoup the lost funds. He attempted to collect from people he lent money to but was unable to after the onset of the economic depression in 1837. Peter decided to emigrate to New York City to seek business opportunities and rebuild his reputation. George accompanied his father to North America, and they left Europe in May 1837.

New York City

The Browns landed in New York in June 1837. Peter opened a dry goods store on Broadway and George worked as his assistant. The following year, Brown's mother and sisters immigrated to New York and the family lived in a rented home on Varick Street. When the store grew larger, George traveled to New England, upstate New York, and Canada to continue growing their business. In July 1842 Peter published the first edition of a newspaper called the British Chronicle, which advocated a Whig-Liberal political ideology and published articles on British news and politics. As circulation increased in Canada, the paper devoted articles to the political news in the Province of Canada. George became the paper's publisher in March 1843 and traveled to New England, upstate New York, and Canada to promote the paper. While in Canada, Brown spoke with politicians and editors in Toronto, Kingston, and Montreal. Brown might have also been writing articles for the paper; J.M.S. Careless, a historian, notes that a series of articles called "A Tour of Canada" were published in the same writing style of Brown's later articles while Brown was in Canada.

Peter Brown supported the evangelical faction during the Disruption of 1843 within the Church of Scotland. These members separated from the Church of Scotland in May 1843 and formed the Free Church of Scotland. While George was touring Canada, they asked him to present an offer to his father: to move publication of the British Chronicle to Upper Canada in exchange for a bond of $2500. George supported the proposal, as he felt there were more opportunities to succeed in Canada. He thought that there was hostility towards the paper in New York because of the paper's focus on Britain. Upon meeting Reform politicians in his travels through Canada, George felt that they would support his paper should it relocate to the province. George convinced his father to move to Canada and they published the last issue of the British Chronicle on July 22, 1843.

Canada

George and Peter rented a storefront in Toronto and on August 18, 1843, they published the first edition a new paper called Banner. George managed the secular department of the newspaper, commenting on non-religious issues. Banner initially did not commit to any political causes, although it supported many policies advocated by Reformers. This changed when the governor-general of the province, Charles Metcalfe, prorogued the Reform-dominated Canadian assembly when several Reform politicians resigned from the government. George published an editorial on December 15 that was critical of the governor-general's actions. In the subsequent weeks, Banner published editorials that disputed political accusations against Reformers and called for unity behind Liberal candidates in future elections.

In 1844, Reformers were concerned that Tories, in the upcoming election for the legislature of the Province of Canada, would appeal to the citizen's sense of loyalty to the British monarch and thus not vote for Reformers. They wanted to establish newspapers that would publish their ideas and offered Brown £250 to begin a new paper. In March, Brown published the first issue of The Globe as its editor and publisher. Two months later, Brown bought a rotary press, the first press of this type used in Upper Canada. This purchase increased his printer's efficiency and allowed Brown to create a book publishing and printing office business. Although George was focused on politics, he still wrote articles for the Banner and traveled in July to Kingston to report on the Canadian Synod for the Church of Scotland. After the meeting, Brown sat on the committee of Free Kirks in Kingston who wanted to secede from the Church of Scotland. In the fall, Brown campaigned for Reform candidates in communities surrounding Toronto. In Halton, Reformers asked Brown to convince one of the three Reform candidates to end their campaign as the county would only elect two candidates and Reformers did not want to split the vote; Brown convinced Caleb Hopkins to end his campaign. Brown declined to run as a candidate because he wanted to help his father pay off his financial debts and focus on improving his newspapers. Reformers were mostly unsuccessful in the election, with many prominent members not returning to the legislature.

In the summer of 1845, Brown put his father in charge of The Globe and traveled to Southwestern Ontario to increase subscriptions to his paper. He discovered that a rival Reform newspaper called Pilot was selling copies at a lower rate and people did not want to subscribe to more than one paper. Brown appealed to Reform leaders, who convinced Francis Hincks, the editor of Pilot, to raise the cost of his paper. In October, Brown published the first edition of Western Globe in London, Canada West, which combined editorials from The Globe with local stories from the southwestern region. In 1846, Brown began publishing the Globe semi-weekly, proclaiming that he was the first Reform-newspaper in Toronto to do so.

During the 1848 Province of Canada legislative election, Hincks was in Montreal attending to business concerns and did not go to Oxford county to campaign for his re-election as the constituency's representative. Brown spoke at the nomination meeting on Hincks's behalf and Hincks was successfully reelected. Reformers won the majority of seats in the election to form an administration led by Baldwin and Louis-Hippolyte Lafontaine. In July 1848 Brown and his father closed the Banner to focus on expanding The Globe and their publishing business.

In the summer of 1848, Brown was appointed by the administration to lead a Royal Commission to examine accusations of official misconduct in the Provincial Penitentiary in Portsmouth, Canada West. The commission's report, drafted by Brown in early 1849, documented abuse within the penitentiary perpetrated by its staff members. He recommended changes in the jail's structure such as separating juvenile, first-time, and long-term prisoners and hiring prison inspectors. While the commission was conducting its investigation, the prison's Board of Inspectors resigned and Brown, along with Adam Fergusson and William Bristow. Although initially volunteers, Brown and Bristow were later paid for their work, becoming the first government inspectors to be employed in this role. In October 1853 The Globe started printing new issues daily and claimed that the paper had the largest circulation in British North America.

Early political career

Election win and opposition member

In 1848, Reformers won the majority of seats in the Province of Canada legislature and an administration was formed with Robert Baldwin and Louis-Hippolyte Lafontaine serving as co-premiers. By the following year, two factions formed among the Reformers over disagreements among secularising clergy reserves, whether the Province of Canada should be annexed by the United States, and how much influence should be given to Reformers who participated in the Upper Canada Rebellion. Brown remained aligned with the Reform party while others split off to form the Clear Grit movement. He joined the Toronto Anti-Clergy Reserves Association in May 1850 to advocate for the abolition of clergy reserves; he did not think French-Canadian reformers would support these measures, but thought that promoting this policy would prevent further Reform defections to the Clear Grits.

In April 1851, Brown ran in a byelection to represent Haldimand County in the Canadian parliament but lost to William Lyon Mackenzie. In the following session of parliament, Baldwin and Lafontaine announced their retirement from politics, and Hincks assumed leadership of the western Reform movement. Hincks renewed his rivalry with Brown, criticising the Globe for opposing state support for religious institutions. In the fall of 1851, Brown bought agricultural land in Kent county, Upper Canada, to begin work as a farmer. Later that year, Reformers in Kent county, including Alexander Mackenzie and Archibald McKellar, encouraged Brown to run in the upcoming Canadian parliament election for the constituency of Kent county. Brown accepted their offer and was nominated as a Reform candidate, even though he planned to campaign against the current Reform ministry's state support for religious institutions. He also campaigned in support of representation by population, free trade agreements with British colonies and the United States, and the development of transportation infrastructures like rail lines and canals. Brown won the election as an independent Reform candidate, defeating Arthur Rankin, the Reformer's ministry-approved candidate, and a Tory opponent.

Brown supported an administration led by Hincks and Augustin-Norbert Morin as successors to the Baldin-Lafontaine government, though he criticised the government for abandoning liberal ideals. Brown worked to end state support for religious institutions, opposed government funding for a religious separate school system and endorsed representation by population in the legislature. His newspaper, the Globe, still had widespread circulation and on October 1 started publishing every day as the Daily Globe to compete with other newspapers who had previously started to publish daily. Brown's support deteriorated when scandals against Hincks were reported in the fall of 1853 and Brown toured Canada West, demanding new leadership for the Reform party. For the 1854 general election, the constituency he represented was split into two and he decided to run in Lambton, as he was not confident that he could win the other Kent constitutency. At the election's conclusion, Hincks formed a new Liberal-Conservative administration with Allan MacNab, causing Brown to become a member of the opposition.

Brown worked with his opposition colleagues, including former Clear Grit rivals, Reformers who abandoned Hincks, and the Parti Rouge, to criticise the governing coalition. For these efforts, Brown assumed an unofficial role as one of the leaders of the opposition members. He also bought two Grit-aligned newspapers and merged their staffs to his Globe paper. In May 1855, the Canadian legislature passed a bill that allowed the creation of Roman Catholic-based separate school boards in Upper Canada. This was seen as French-Canadian encroachment into Upper Canadian matters, as the bill passed without the support of the majority of Upper Canadian parliamentarians. Brown used the event to campaign for representation by population, in which electoral districts would be divided so that each one contained a roughly equal number of electors. Brown's pursuit of that goal of correcting what he perceived to be a great wrong to Canada West was accompanied at times by stridently critical remarks against French Canadians and the power exerted by the Catholic population of Canada East over the affairs of a predominately anglophone and Protestant Canada West. He referred to the position of Canada West as "a base vassalage to French-Canadian Priestcraft."

In 1856, Liberals in the Hincks-MacNab administration defected to the opposition, and MacNab was replaced by John A. Macdonald to become the new joint-premier of the province with Hincks. Macdonald accused Brown of falsifying evidence and coercing witnesses in the Royal Commission on the Kingston Provincial Penitentiary in 1848. A committee of inquiry was formed that heard evidence exonerating Brown, but the inquiry produced a report that was non-committal and damaged Brown's political reputation. This caused the political rivalry between Brown and Macdonald to deepen.

1857 election and subsequent legislature

Brown organized a political convention on January 8, 1857, to unite his followers with Liberals who left the Hincks administration and Clear Grits. This convention marked the Reform party's transition away from a radicalism and towards a political ideology more closely aligned with the liberal ideology in Britain. An election for the Parliament of the Province of Canada was held in November 1857. Brown was elected in two constituencies: Toronto and North Oxford. Although Brown's reformers won the majority of seats in Canada West, their allies in the Parti Rouge were unsuccessful in Canada East and Brown returned as an opposition member.

On July 28, 1858, the cabinet of the Macdonald-Cartier administration resigned when the legislature rejected Ottawa as the new permanent capital of the province. Edmund Walker Head, the governor-general of Canada, asked Brown to form a new administration. Although Brown did not have a majority of support in the legislature, he nevertheless proposed a cabinet under a co-premiership with Antoine-Aimé Dorion. The Brown-Dorion administration was rejected by the legislature on August 2. Brown resigned on August 4 when Head refused to call a general election, and Macdonald and Cartier were able to form a new ministry with Alexander Tilloch Galt.

In 1859 the Globe, influenced by Brown's encouragement, published articles in favour of a new federal government. This would allow Canada East and Canada West to govern their own affairs in their own provincial legislatures and the federal legislature would pass bills concerning mutual concerns. The newspaper also supported representation by population within this proposed federal government. On April 30, 1860, Brown proposed a bill in the Province of Canada's legislature to form a convention that would discuss federalism. The bill was defeated, but the Reform party's support for federalism was documented in the vote.

Election defeat and marriage

Brown's health deteriorated and in the winter of 1861, he stayed in his bed for two months to recover. He did not attend the 1861 parliamentary session and lost his re-election campaign in the constituency of Toronto in the June 1861 general election. His newspaper supported the union in the American Civil War and opposed the influence of the Grand Trunk Railway in Canadian politics.

In 1862 Brown's illness was still affecting him and he decided to recover in Great Britain. He spent a month in London before moving to Edinburgh. He met Anne Nelson, the sister of his friends from the High School, and they wed on November 27 at the Nelson's home. The couple returned to Toronto the following month.

Return to legislature

With his health recovered, Brown won a by-election for the constituency of South Oxford in March 1863 and returned to a leadership position within the Reform party. He won re-election during the July 1863 general election, and Reformers won the majority of seats in Canada West while Conservatives won the majority of seats in Canada East. This created a deadlock in the legislature that made governing the province difficult.

Brown proposed a select committee to investigate the sectional problems in Canada and try to find a solution, and the bill for this committee's creation passed in spring 1864. Under his chairmanship, the committee reported on June 14 a strong preference for a new federal system of government. That same day, the MacDonald-Taché administration was dissolved. Brown stated that he would support any administration that committed to solving the deadlock in the legislature. Brown, MacDonald, Taché, and George-Étienne Cartier agreed to form an administration later called the Great Coalition to seek a federal union with the Atlantic provinces. Brown became the president of the council, a cabinet-level position, under the premiership of Taché.

Confederation 

Brown attended the Charlottetown Conference where Canadian delegates outlined their proposal for Canadian Confederation with the Atlantic provinces. On September 5, 1864, Brown outlined the proposed constitutional structure for the union. The conference accepted the proposal in principle and Brown attended subsequent meetings in Halifax, Nova Scotia and Saint John, New Brunswick to determine the details of the union.

During the Quebec Conference, Brown argued for separate provincial and federal governments. He hoped the provincial government would remove local concerns from the federal government, which he thought were more politically divisive. He also argued for an appointed Senate because he saw upper houses as inherently conservative and believed they protected the interests of the rich. He wished to deny the Senate the legitimacy and power that naturally follow with an electoral mandate. He was also concerned that two elected legislative bodies could create a political deadlock, especially if different parties held a majority of seats in each body. The result of the Quebec Conference was the Quebec Resolutions. Brown presented the Quebec Resolutions in a speech in Toronto on November 3. Later that month, he traveled to England to begin discussions with British officials about Candian confederation, the integration of the North West Territories into Canada, and the defense of British North America from possible American invasion.

Brown realized that satisfaction for Canada West could only be achieved with the support of the French-speaking majority of Canada East. In his speech in support of Confederation in the Legislature of the Province of Canada on February 8, 1865, he spoke glowingly of the prospects for Canada's future, and he insisted that "whether we ask for parliamentary reform for Canada alone or in union with the Maritime Provinces, the views of French Canadians must be consulted as well as ours. This scheme can be carried, and no scheme can be that has not the support of both sections of the province." Although he supported the idea of a legislative union at the Quebec Conference, Brown was eventually persuaded to favour the federal view of Confederation, which was closer to that supported by Cartier and the Bleus of Canada East, as it was the structure that would ensure that the provinces retained sufficient control over local matters to satisfy the need of the French-speaking population in Canada East for jurisdiction over matters that it considered to be essential to its survival. Brown remained a proponent of a stronger central government, with weaker constituent provincial governments.

In May and June, Brown was part of a delegation sent to London to continue discussions about confederation with British officials. The British government agreed to support Canadian confederation, defend Canada if attacked by the US, and help with establishing a new trade agreement with the US. In September, Galt and Brown represented the Province of Canada at the Confederate Trade Council, a meeting of Canadian colonies to negotiate common trade policies after the colonies' reciprocity trade agreement with the United States was terminated. During the meeting, Brown spoke with Maritime delegates to gather support for the Canadian confederation, as support for the project was decreasing in New Brunswick and Nova Scotia. He supported the council's resolution to pursue trade policies that reduced tariffs with the US. The administration for the Province of Canada disagreed and sought to increase tariffs on American goods. Brown, frustrated with his cabinet colleagues over this issue, resigned from the Great Coalition on December 19.

Brown renewed relationships with Rouge colleagues to strengthen the Reform party's political prospects in Canada West. He lost an election in Southern Ontario for a seat in the new legislature. He determined that too many Reformers joined Macdonald and the Conservatives during the Great Coalition, and the public supported this non-partisan administration. He declined to run in safer constituencies and went on a holiday to Scotland.

Post-parliamentary career and death 
 

In 1866, Brown bought an estate near Brantford, Upper Canada, and herded shorthorn cattle. He continued writing and editing the Globe and was consulted by Grit officials in issues concerning provincial and Canadian politics. Brown fought numerous battles with the typographical union from 1843 to 1872. He was forced to pay union wages after tense negotiations and strikes.

In 1874, Prime Minister Alexander Mackenzie asked Brown to negotiate a new reciprocity treaty with the US. He negotiated with the United States Secretary of State Hamilton Fish from February until June 18, when a draft of their treaty was proposed in the US Congress. The Congress did not pass the bill into law and it was set aside when Congress adjourned four days after the treaty was proposed.

Brown was appointed to the Canadian senate in 1874 and attended his first session the following year. He supported Mackenzie when Edward Blake and the Canada First movement expressed their frustrations with Mackenzie's leadership. His attendance in the senate was sporadic as he focused on the business affairs at his ranch. He traveled to England in February 1876 to raise capital to create a new company based on raising cattle, and obtained a charter for the new company upon his return to Canada in May. His company struggled to be financially successful and two fires in December 1879 destroyed many of the buildings on the property.

In 1880 the Globe was also struggling financially as Brown paid for updating the newspaper's printing press in order to produce multi-page and machine-folded papers. On March 25, 1880, a former Globe employee, George Bennett, burst into Brown's office; he was recently fired by a foreman and wanted a certificate that showed he had worked for the paper for five years. Brown did not recognise the man, so asked him to speak with the foreman. The two men argued and Bennett pulled out a gun. Brown grabbed for the gun, but it fired a bullet into Brown's thigh. Bennett was secured by other men and the wound was deemed minor. Brown left the office and stayed in his Toronto home to recover. His leg became infected and he obtained a fever and delirium. On May 9, 1880, Brown died in his Toronto home. Brown was buried at Toronto Necropolis. Bennett was subsequently charged and hanged.

His wife, Anne Nelson, returned to Scotland thereafter where she died in 1906. She is buried on the southern terrace of Dean Cemetery in Edinburgh. The grave also commemorates George Brown. In 1885 his daughters Margaret and Catherine were two of the first women to graduate from the University of Toronto.

Political philosophy and views

Brown was raised as a member of the Church of Scotland. Canadian historian J. M. S. Careless described the family's faith as further from the Calvinist interpretation of the bible and more closely followed the tenets of the evangelical movement of the 1800s. Brown advocated for a Puritan separation between politics and religion; he believed that political liberty could only be achieved if religious institutions were not involved in politics, and while he believed everyone should be Christian, he thought political institutions should not influence religion. In 1850, although he was against giving state money to religions in clergy reserves, he was willing to tolerate it in order to maintain an allegiance between the Upper Canadian Reformers and French Canadian Catholic Reformers.

Brown was against slavery and believed that the largest fault of the United States was the enslavement of people in American southern states. He was part of the Elgin Association, a group of mostly Free Kirk people that purchased land in Kent county for escaped slaves to live on. He also wrote editorials in The Globe defending a settlement of escaped slaves in Buxton from hostile white inhabitants in Kent. He was also an executive member of the Anti-Slavery Society of Canada.

Throughout the Province of Canada's existence, Brown advocated against dissolving the union. In the 1850s he was worried that a dissolved union would cause the St Lawrence River, a major thorough way for trade, to be hampered by the two jurisdictions imposing different rules on their section of the river. When choosing how to transport their goods, farmers to the west of Upper Canada might use the Erie Canal in the United States instead (as this route would have one set of rules) and potentially setting up American annexation of those lands. Brown advocated for representation by population as a way to ensure the French population did not have out-sized power. He wanted to maintain the defensive and trade advantages that a unified province would have and looked to incorporate the Maritime provinces into the union.

Legacy 

Brown's residence, formerly called Lambton Lodge and now called George Brown House, at 186 Beverley Street, Toronto, was named a National Historic Site of Canada in 1974. It is now operated by the Ontario Heritage Trust as a conference centre and offices.

Brown also maintained an estate, Bow Park, near Brantford, Ontario. Bought in 1826, it was a cattle farm during Brown's time and is currently a seed farm.

Toronto's George Brown College (founded 1967) is named after him. A statue of Brown can be found on the front west lawn of Queen's Park and another on Parliament Hill in Ottawa (sculpted by George William Hill in 1913).

He was portrayed by Peter Outerbridge in the 2011 CBC Television film John A.: Birth of a Country.

George Brown appears on a Canadian postage stamp issued on August 21, 1968.

References

Citations

Works cited

Further reading
 Bélanger, Claude. "George Brown", in L’Encyclopédie de l’histoire du Québec / The Quebec History Encyclopedia. (Marianopolis College, March 2006) online
Careless, J.M.C. Brown of the Globe: Volume Two: Statesman of Confederation 1860-1880. (Vol. 2. Dundurn, 1996) excerpt
 Careless, J.M.C. "George Brown and Confederation," Manitoba Historical Society Transactions, Series 3, Number 26, 1969-70 online
 Caron, Jean-François. George Brown: la Confédération et la dualité nationale, Québec: Les Presses de l'Université Laval, 2017.
 Creighton, Donald G. "George Brown, Sir John Macdonald, and the "Workingman"." Canadian Historical Review (1943) 24#4 pp: 362-376.
 Gauvreau, Michael. "Reluctant Voluntaries: Peter and George Brown: The Scottish Disruption and the Politics of Church and State in Canada." Journal of religious history 25.2 (2001): 134–157.
 Mackenzie, Alexander. The life and speeches of Hon. George Brown (Toronto, Globe, 1882)

External links 

 Meet the Browns: A Confederation Family , online exhibit on Archives of Ontario website
 George Brown family fonds, Archives of Ontario

A website for an upcoming documentary film on George Brown
 (Biography by John Lewis)
 
Photograph: Hon. George Brown in 1865. McCord Museum
Photograph: Hon. George Brown in 1865. McCord Museum

1818 births
1880 deaths
1880 murders in Canada
19th-century Canadian newspaper publishers (people)
Assassinated Canadian politicians
Canadian abolitionists
Canadian murder victims
Canadian newspaper founders
Canadian Presbyterians
Canadian senators from Ontario
Candidates in the 1867 Canadian federal election
Fathers of Confederation
Immigrants to the Province of Canada
Leaders of the Ontario Liberal Party
Liberal Party of Canada candidates for the Canadian House of Commons
Liberal Party of Canada senators
Members of the Legislative Assembly of the Province of Canada from Canada West
People from Alloa
People murdered in Toronto
Persons of National Historic Significance (Canada)
Politicians from Toronto
Premiers of the Province of Canada
Presbyterian abolitionists
Scottish emigrants to pre-Confederation Ontario
Deaths from gangrene
Burials at Toronto Necropolis